Mauricio Loffreda Zinula (born 29 October 1990) is a Uruguayan footballer who plays as a defender for C.A. Progreso in the Uruguayan Primera División.

References

External links

1990 births
Living people
Huracán F.C. players
Villa Teresa players
Uruguayan Primera División players
Uruguayan Segunda División players
C.A. Progreso players
Uruguayan footballers
Association football defenders